Antoine Touron (5 September 1686 – 2 September 1775) was a French Dominican biographer and historian.

He was born at Graulhet, Tarn, France, the son of a merchant, and seems to have joined the Dominicans at an early age. After the completion of his studies he taught philosophy and theology to the students of his province (Toulouse); but the later years of his life were devoted to biography, history, and apologetics.  He died at Paris.

He wrote twenty-nine books, dealing largely with the history of the Dominican order and the biographical sketches of its notable men. Père Mortier, in his Histoire des maîtres généraux de l'ordre des frères prêcheurs, made generous use of his Histoire des hommes illustres....

Touron's writings include:
 "Vie de saint Thomas d'Aquin" (considered his best work)
 "Vie de saint Dominique avec une hist. abrégée des ses premiers disciples"
 "Hist. des hommes illustres de l'ordre de saint Dominique"
 "De la providence, traité hist., dogmat. et mor."
 "La main de Dieu sur les incrédules, ou hist. abrégée des Israélites", a work in which he shows that as often as the Chosen People proved false to their Divine vocation, they were punished by God
 "Parallèle de l'incrédule et du vrai fidèle"
 "La vie et l'esprit de saint Charles Borromée"
 "La verité vengée en faveur de saint Thomas"
 "Hist. génerale de l'Amérique depuis sa découverte", an ecclesiastical history of the New World.

References

External links
 Source

1686 births
1775 deaths
French Dominicans
18th-century French historians
French male non-fiction writers